WXPR (91.7 FM) is a community-licensed public radio station serving north central Wisconsin and adjacent areas of Michigan's Upper Peninsula.  Licensed to Rhinelander, Wisconsin, United States, the station is owned by White Pine Community Broadcasting, a nonprofit educational corporation. WXPR is a National Public Radio member station as well as an affiliate of Native Voice One, with Native Voice One providing most of their overnight programming. The studios are at 28 N. Stevens St. in downtown Rhinelander, in a historic building previously occupied by the local newspaper.  The transmitter is off Oneida County Highway A between Sugar Camp and Three Lakes, Wisconsin, southwest of Thunder Lake.

The station operates satellite WXPW at 91.9 FM in Wausau.  In a share-time arrangement, WXPW shares 91.9 with WLBL-FM, the Wausau outlet for Wisconsin Public Radio's Ideas Network.  WXPW airs from 6 p.m. to 4 a.m. from Monday through Thursday and from 6 p.m. on Friday to 5 p.m. on Sunday.

History

The vision for WXPR was developed by Peter Nordgren, whose previous involvement in noncommercial radio was with WSSU at the University of Wisconsin-Superior, as well as KBSB and KAXE.  Other early staff and supporters included Mary Kay Foltz Sherer, a fundraising specialist from Minocqua who would go on to be development director at Wisconsin Public Radio, retired Army Signal Corps colonel Elmer Goetsch, and construction worker Robert M. (Mick) Fiocchi of Rhinelander, later WXPR's general manager.  The first program director was W. Scott Yankus, later with Minnesota Public Radio and Marketplace (radio program); other staff included news director Jeff Gavin and programming staff Rita Rahoi, later a professor of communications at Winona State University.  WXPR was one of fourteen stations in underserved areas whose development in the early 1980s was supported by expansion grants from the Corporation for Public Broadcasting.

Translators

References

External links
 WXPR official website

 
 Radio Locator information on W265AI

NPR member stations
Public broadcasting in Wisconsin
Public radio stations in the United States
XPR